The Treaty of Waitangi is a document of central importance to the History of New Zealand, its constitution, and its national mythos. It has played a major role in the treatment of the Māori population in New Zealand, by successive governments and the wider population, a role that has been especially prominent from the late 20th century. The treaty document is an agreement, not a treaty as recognised in international law and it has no independent legal status, being legally effective only to the extent it is recognised in various statutes. It was first signed on 6 February 1840 by Captain William Hobson as consul for the British Crown and by Māori chiefs from the North Island of New Zealand. 

The treaty was written at a time when the New Zealand Company, acting on behalf of large numbers of settlers and would-be settlers, were establishing a colony in New Zealand, and when some Māori leaders had petitioned the British for protection against French ambitions. It was drafted with the intention of establishing a British Governor of New Zealand, recognising Māori ownership of their lands, forests and other possessions, and giving Māori the rights of British subjects. It was intended by the British Crown to ensure that when Lieutenant Governor Hobson subsequently made the declaration of British sovereignty over New Zealand in May 1840, the Māori people would not feel that their rights had been ignored. Once it had been written and translated, it was first signed by Northern Māori leaders at Waitangi. Copies were subsequently taken around New Zealand and over the following months many other chiefs signed. Around 530 to 540 Māori, at least 13 of them women, signed the Māori language version of the Treaty of Waitangi, despite some Māori leaders cautioning against it. Only 39 signed the English version. An immediate result of the treaty was that Queen Victoria's government gained the sole right to purchase land. In total there are nine signed copies of the Treaty of Waitangi, including the sheet signed on 6 February 1840 at Waitangi.

The text of the treaty includes a preamble and three articles. It is bilingual, with the Māori text translated in the context of the time from the English.

 Article one of the Māori text grants governance rights to the Crown while the English text cedes "all rights and powers of sovereignty" to the Crown.
 Article two of the Māori text establishes that Māori will retain full chieftainship over their lands, villages and all their treasures while the English text establishes the continued ownership of the Māori over their lands and establishes the exclusive right of pre-emption of the Crown.
 Article three gives Māori people full rights and protections as British subjects.

As some words in the English treaty did not translate directly into the written Māori language of the time, the Māori text is not an exact translation of the English text, particularly in relation to the meaning of having and ceding sovereignty. These differences created disagreements in the decades following the signing, eventually contributing to the New Zealand Wars of 1845 to 1872 and continuing through to the Treaty of Waitangi settlements starting in the early 1990s.

During the second half of the 19th century Māori generally lost control of much of the land they had owned, sometimes through legitimate sale, but often by way of unfair land-deals, settlers occupying land that had not been sold, or through outright confiscations in the aftermath of the New Zealand Wars. In the period following the New Zealand Wars, the New Zealand government mostly ignored the treaty, and a court-case judgement in 1877 declared it to be "a simple nullity". Beginning in the 1950s, Māori increasingly sought to use the treaty as a platform for claiming additional rights to sovereignty and to reclaim lost land, and governments in the 1960s and 1970s responded to these arguments, giving the treaty an increasingly central role in the interpretation of land rights and relations between Māori people and the state. In 1975 the New Zealand Parliament passed the Treaty of Waitangi Act, establishing the Waitangi Tribunal as a permanent commission of inquiry tasked with interpreting the treaty, researching breaches of the treaty by the Crown or its agents, and suggesting means of redress. In most cases, recommendations of the tribunal are not binding on the Crown, but settlements totalling almost $1 billion have been awarded to various Māori groups. Various legislation passed in the latter part of the 20th century has made reference to the treaty, which has led to ad hoc incorporation of the treaty in law. As a result, the treaty has now become widely regarded as the founding document of New Zealand.

The New Zealand government established Waitangi Day as a national holiday in 1974; each year the holiday commemorates the date of the signing of the treaty.

Early history

The first contact between the Māori and Europeans was in 1642, when Dutch explorer Abel Tasman arrived and was fought off, and again in 1769 when the English navigator Captain James Cook claimed New Zealand for Britain at the Mercury Islands. Nevertheless, the British government showed little interest in following up this claim for over half a century. The first mention of New Zealand in British statutes is in the Murders Abroad Act of 1817, which clarified that New Zealand was not a British colony (despite being claimed by Captain Cook) and "not within His Majesty's dominions". Between 1795 and 1830 a steady flow of sealing and then whaling ships visited New Zealand, mainly stopping at the Bay of Islands for food supplies and recreation. Many of the ships came from Sydney. Trade between Sydney and New Zealand increased as traders sought kauri timber and flax and missionaries purchased large areas of land in the Bay of Islands. This trade was seen as mutually advantageous, and Māori tribes competed for access to the services of Europeans that had chosen to live on the islands because they brought goods and knowledge that were essential to the local tribe. At the same time, Europeans living in New Zealand needed the protection that Māori chiefs could provide. As a result of trade, Māori society changed drastically up to the 1840s. They changed their society from one of subsistence farming and gathering to cultivating useful trade crops.

While heading the parliamentary campaign against the British slave trade for twenty years until the passage of the Slave Trade Act of 1807, William Wilberforce championed the foundation of the Church Missionary Society (CMS) in 1799, with other members of the Clapham Sect including John Venn, determined to improve the treatment of indigenous people by the British. This led to the establishment of their Christian mission in New Zealand, which saw laymen arriving from 1814 to teach building, farming and Christianity to Māori, as well as training 'native' ministers. The Māori language did not then have an indigenous writing system. Missionaries learned to speak Māori, and introduced the Latin alphabet. The CMS, including Thomas Kendall; Māori, including Tītore and Hongi Hika; and Cambridge University's Samuel Lee, developed the written language between 1817 and 1830. In 1833, while living in the Paihia mission house of Anglican priest and the now head of the New Zealand CMS mission (later to become the New Zealand Church Missionary Society) Rev Henry Williams, missioner William Colenso published the Māori translations of books of the Bible, the first books printed in New Zealand. His 1837 Māori New Testament was the first indigenous language translation of the Bible published in the southern hemisphere. Demand for the Māori New Testament, and the Prayer Book that followed, grew exponentially, as did Christian Māori leadership and public Christian services, with 33,000 Māori soon attending regularly. Literacy and understanding the Bible increased  and social and economic benefits, decreased slavery and intertribal violence, and increased peace and respect for all people in Māori society, including women.

Māori generally respected the British, partially due to their relationships with missionaries and also due to British status as a major maritime power, which had been made apparent to Māori travelling outside New Zealand. The other major powers in the area around the 1830s included American whalers, whom the Māori accepted as cousins of the British, and French Catholics who came for trade and as missionaries. The Māori were still deeply distrustful of the French, due to a massacre of 250 people that had occurred in 1772, when they retaliated for the killing of Marion du Fresne and some of his crew. While the threat of the French never materialised, in 1831 it prompted thirteen major chiefs from the far north of the country to meet at Kerikeri to compose a letter to King William IV asking for Britain to be a "friend and guardian" of New Zealand. It is the first known plea for British intervention written by Māori. In response, the British government sent James Busby in 1832 to be the British Resident in New Zealand. In 1834 Busby drafted a document known as the Declaration of the Independence of New Zealand, He Whakaputanga which he and 35 northern Māori chiefs signed at Waitangi on 28 October 1835, establishing those chiefs as representatives of a proto-state under the title of the "United Tribes of New Zealand". This document was not well received by the Colonial Office in Britain, and it was decided that a new policy for New Zealand was needed. From a Māori perspective, The Declaration of Independence, was twofold, one for the British to establish control of its lawless subjects in New Zealand, and two, to establish internationally the mana and sovereignty of Māori leaders.

From May to July 1836, Royal Navy officer Captain William Hobson, under instruction from Governor of New South Wales Sir Richard Bourke, visited New Zealand to investigate claims of lawlessness in its settlements. Hobson recommended in his report that British sovereignty be established over New Zealand, in small pockets similar to the Hudson's Bay Company in Canada. Hobson's report was forwarded to the Colonial Office. From April to May 1838, the House of Lords held a select committee into the "State of the Islands of New Zealand". The New Zealand Association (later the New Zealand Company), missionaries, Joel Samuel Polack, and the Royal Navy made submissions to the committee.

On 15 June 1839 new Letters Patent were issued to expand the territory of New South Wales to include the entire territory of New Zealand, from latitude 34° South to 47° 10' South, and from longitude 166° 5' East to 179° East. Governor of New South Wales George Gipps was appointed Governor over New Zealand. This was the first clear expression of British intent to annex New Zealand.

Hobson was called to the Colonial Office on the evening of 14 August 1839 and given instructions to take the constitutional steps needed to establish a British colony. He was appointed Consul to New Zealand and was instructed to negotiate a voluntary transfer of sovereignty from the Māori to the British Crown as the House of Lords select committee had recommended in 1837. Normanby gave Hobson three instructions – to seek a cession of sovereignty, to assume complete control over land matters, and to establish a form of civil government, but he did not provide a draft of the treaty. Normanby wrote at length about the need for British intervention as essential to protect Māori interests, but this was somewhat deceptive. Hobson's instructions gave no provision for Māori government of any kind nor any Māori involvement in the administrative structure of the new colony. His instructions required him to:
treat with the Aborigines of New Zealand for the recognition of Her Majesty's Sovereign authority over the whole or any part of those islands which they may be willing to place under Her Majesty's dominion.

Historian Claudia Orange argues that prior to 1839 the Colonial Office had initially planned a "Māori New Zealand" in which European settlers would be accommodated without a full colony where Māori might retain ownership and authority over much of the land and cede some land to settlers as part of a colony governed by the Crown. Normanby's instructions in 1839 show that the Colonial Office had shifted their stance toward colonisation and "a settler New Zealand in which a place had to be kept for Māori", primarily due to pressure from increasing numbers of British colonists, and the prospect of a private enterprise in the form of the New Zealand Company colonising New Zealand outside of the British Crown's jurisdiction. The Colonial Office was forced to accelerate its plans because of both the New Zealand Company's hurried dispatch of the Tory to New Zealand on 12 May 1839 to purchase land, and plans by French Captain Jean François L'Anglois to establish a French colony in Akaroa. After examining Colonial Office documents and correspondence (both private and public) of those who developed the policies that led to the development of the treaty, historian Paul Moon similarly argues that the treaty was not envisioned with deliberate intent to assert sovereignty over Māori, but that the Crown originally only intended to apply rule over British subjects living in the fledgling colony, and these rights were later expanded by subsequent governors through perceived necessity.

Hobson left London on 15 August 1839 and was sworn in as Lieutenant-Governor in Sydney on 14 January, finally arriving in the Bay of Islands on 29 January 1840. Meanwhile, a second New Zealand Company ship, the Cuba, had arrived in Port Nicholson on 3 January 1840 with a survey party to prepare for settlement. The Aurora, the first ship carrying immigrants, arrived on 22 January.

On 30 January 1840 Hobson attended the Christ Church at Kororareka (Russell) where he publicly read a number of proclamations. The first was the Letters Patent 1839, in relation to the extension of the boundaries of New South Wales to include the islands of New Zealand. The second was in relation to Hobson's own appointment as Lieutenant-Governor of New Zealand. The third was in relation to land transactions (notably on the issue of pre-emption).

CMS printer William Colenso created a Māori circular for the United Tribes high chiefs inviting them to meet " Hobson" on 5 February at Busby's Waitangi home.

Drafting and translating the treaty

Without a draft document prepared by lawyers or Colonial Office officials, Hobson was forced to write his own treaty with the help of his secretary, James Freeman, and British Resident James Busby, neither of whom was a lawyer. Historian Paul Moon believes certain articles of the treaty resemble the Treaty of Utrecht (1713), the British Sherbro Agreement (1825) and the treaty between Britain and Soombia Soosoos (1826).

The entire treaty was prepared in three days, in which it underwent many revisions. There were doubts even during the drafting process that the Māori chiefs would be able to understand the concept of relinquishing "sovereignty".

Assuming that a treaty in English could not be understood, debated or agreed to by Māori, Hobson asked CMS head missioner Henry Williams, and his son Edward Marsh Williams, who was a scholar in Māori language and custom, to translate the document overnight on 4 February. Henry Williams was concerned with the actions of the New Zealand Company in Wellington and felt he had to agree with Hobson's request to ensure the treaty would be as favourable as possible to Māori. Williams avoided using any English words that had no expression in Māori "thereby preserving entire the spirit and tenor" of the treaty. He added a note to the copy Hobson sent to Gibbs stating, "I certify that the above is as literal a translation of the Treaty of Waitangi as the idiom of the language will allow." 

This no doubt was a reference to the northern confederation of chiefs with whom Hobson preferred to negotiate, who eventually made up the vast majority of signatories to the treaty. Hobson believed that elsewhere in the country the Crown could exercise greater freedom over the rights of "first discoverers", which proved unwise as it led to future difficulties with other tribes in the South Island.

Debate and signing

Overnight on the 4–5 February the original English version of the treaty was translated into Māori. On the morning of 5 February the Māori and English versions of the treaty were put before a gathering of northern chiefs inside a large marquee on the lawn in front of Busby's house at Waitangi. Hobson read the treaty aloud in English and Williams read the Māori translation and explained each section and warned the chiefs not to rush to decide whether to sign. Building on Biblical understanding, he said:

Māori chiefs then debated the treaty for five hours, much of which was recorded and translated by the Paihia missionary station printer, William Colenso. Rewa, a Catholic chief, who had been influenced by the French Catholic Bishop Pompallier, said "The Māori people don't want a governor! We aren't European. It's true that we've sold some of our lands. But this country is still ours! We chiefs govern this land of our ancestors". Moka 'Kainga-mataa' argued that all land unjustly purchased by Europeans should be returned. Whai asked: "Yesterday I was cursed by a white man. Is that the way things are going to be?". Protestant Chiefs such as Hōne Heke, Pumuka, Te Wharerahi, Tāmati Wāka Nene and his brother Eruera Maihi Patuone were accepting of the Governor. Hōne Heke said:

Tāmati Wāka Nene said to the chiefs:

Bishop Pompallier, who had been counselling the many Catholic Māori in the north concerning the treaty, urged them to be very wary of the treaty and not to sign anything.

For Māori chiefs, the signing at Waitangi would have needed a great deal of trust. Nonetheless, the expected benefits of British protection must have outweighed their fears. In particular, the French were also interested in New Zealand, and there were fears that if they did not side with the British that the French would put pressure on them in a similar manner to that of other Pacific Islanders farther north in what would become French Polynesia.  Most importantly, Māori leaders trusted CMS missionary advice and their explanation of the treaty. The missionaries had explained the treaty as a covenant between Māori and Queen Victoria, the head of state and Church of England. With nearly half the Māori population following Christianity many looked at the treaty as a Biblical covenant – a sacred bond.

Afterwards, the chiefs then moved to a river flat below Busby's house and lawn and continued deliberations late into the night. Busby's house would later become known as the Treaty House and is today New Zealand's most visited historic building.

Hobson had planned for the signing to occur on 7 February however on the morning of 6 February 45 chiefs were waiting ready to sign. Around noon a ship carrying two officers from HMS Herald arrived and were surprised to hear they were waiting for the Governor so a boat was quickly despatched back to let him know. Although the official painting of the signing shows Hobson wearing full naval regalia, he was in fact not expecting the chiefs that day and was wearing his dressing gown or "in plain clothes, except his hat". Several hundred Māori were waiting and only Busby, Williams, Colenso and a few other Europeans.

Article Four
French Catholic Bishop Jean-Baptiste Pompallier soon joined the gathering and after Anglican English priest and CMS mission head Rev Henry Williams read the Māori translation aloud from a final parchment version. Pompallier spoke to Hobson who then addressed Williams:

Williams attempted to do so vocally, but as this was technically another clause in the treaty, Colenso asked for it to be added in writing, which Williams did, also adding Māori custom. The statement says:

This addition is sometimes referred to as article four of the treaty, and is recognised as relating to the right to freedom of religion and belief.

First signings
The treaty signing began in the afternoon. Hobson headed the British signatories. Hōne Heke was the first of the Māori chiefs who signed that day. As each chief signed Hobson said "", meaning "We are [now] one people". This was probably at the request of Williams, knowing the significance, especially to Christian chiefs, 'Māori and British would be linked, as subjects of the Queen and followers of Christ'. Two chiefs, Marupō and Ruhe, protested strongly against the treaty as the signing took place but they eventually signed and after Marupō shook the Governor's hand, seized hold of his hat which was on the table and gestured to put it on. Over 40 chiefs signed the treaty that afternoon, which concluded with a chief leading three thundering cheers, and Colenso distributing gifts of two blankets and tobacco to each signatory.

Later signings
Hobson considered the signing at Waitangi to be highly significant, he noted that twenty-six of the forty-six "head chiefs" had signed. Hobson had no intention of requiring the unanimous assent of Māori to the treaty, but was willing to accept a majority, as he reported that the signings at Waitangi represented "Clear recognition of the sovereign rights of Her Majesty over the northern parts of this island". Those that signed at Waitangi did not even represent the north as a whole; an analysis of the signatures shows that most were from the Bay of Islands only and that not many of the chiefs of the highest rank had signed on that day. Hobson considered the initial signing at Waitangi to be the "de facto" treaty, while later signings merely "ratified and confirmed it".

To enhance the treaty's authority, eight additional copies were sent around the country to gather additional signatures:
 the Manukau-Kawhia copy (13 signatures), 
 the Waikato-Manukau copy (39 signatures),
 the Tauranga copy (21 signatures),
 the Bay of Plenty copy (26 signatures),
 the Herald-Bunbury copy (27 signatures),
 the Henry Williams copy (132 signatures),
 the Tūranga (East Coast) copy (41 signatures), and
 the Printed copy (5 signatures).

The Waitangi original received 240 signatures.

About 50 meetings were held from February to September 1840 to discuss and sign the copies, and a further 500 signatures were added to the treaty. While most did eventually sign, especially in the far north where most Māori lived, a number of chiefs and some tribal groups ultimately refused, including Pōtatau Te Wherowhero (Waikato iwi), Tuhoe, Te Arawa and Ngāti Tuwharetoa and possibly Moka 'Kainga-mataa'. A number of non-signatory Waikato and Central North Island chiefs would later form a kind of confederacy with an elected monarch called the Kīngitanga. (The Kīngitanga Movement would later form a primary anti-government force in the New Zealand Wars.) While copies were moved around the country to give as many tribal leaders as possible the opportunity to sign, some missed out, especially in the South Island, where inclement weather prevented copies from reaching Otago or Stewart Island. Assent to the treaty was large in Kaitaia, as well as the Wellington to Whanganui region, but there were at least some holdouts in every other part of New Zealand.

Māori were the first indigenous race to sign a document giving them British citizenship and promising their protection. Hobson was grateful to Williams and stated a British colony would not have been established in New Zealand without the CMS missionaries.

Sovereignty proclamations 
On 21 May 1840, Lieutenant-Governor Hobson proclaimed sovereignty over the whole country, (the North Island by treaty and the South Island and Stewart Island by discovery) and New Zealand was constituted the Colony of New Zealand, separate from New South Wales by a Royal Charter issued on 16 November 1840, with effect from 3 May 1841.

In Hobson's first dispatch to the British government, he stated that the North Island had been ceded with "unanimous adherence" (which was not accurate) and while Hobson claimed the South Island by discovery based on the "uncivilised state of the natives", in actuality he had no basis to make such a claim. Hobson issued the proclamation because he felt it was forced on him by settlers from the New Zealand Company at Port Nicholson who had formed an independent settlement government and claimed legality from local chiefs, two days after the proclamation on 23 May 1840, Hobson declared the settlement's government as illegal. Hobson also failed to report to the British government that the Māori text of the treaty was substantially different from the English one (which he might not have known at the time) and also reported that both texts had received 512 signatures, where in truth the majority of signatures had been on the Māori copies that had been sent around the country, rather than on the single English copy. Basing their decision on this information, on 2 October 1840, the Colonial Office approved Hobson's proclamation. They did not have second thoughts when later reports revealed more detail about the inadequacies of the treaty negotiations, and they did not take issue with the fact that large areas of the North Island had not signed. The government had never asked for Hobson to obtain unanimous agreement from the indigenous people.

Extant copies

In 1841, treaty documents, housed in an iron box, narrowly escaped damage when the government offices at Official Bay in Auckland were destroyed by fire. They disappeared from sight until 1865 when a Native Department officer worked on them in Wellington at the request of parliament and produced an erroneous list of signatories. The papers were fastened together and then deposited in a safe in the Colonial Secretary's office.

In 1877, the English-language rough draft of the treaty was published along with photolithographic facsimiles, and the originals were returned to storage. In 1908, historian and bibliographer Thomas Hocken, searching for historical documents, found the treaty papers in the basement of the Old Government Buildings in poor condition, damaged at the edges by water and partly eaten by rodents. The papers were restored by the Dominion Museum in 1913 and kept in special boxes from then on. In February 1940, the treaty documents were taken to Waitangi for display in the Treaty House during the Centenary celebrations. It was possibly the first time the treaty document had been on public display since it was signed. After the outbreak of war with Japan, they were placed with other state documents in an outsize luggage trunk and deposited for secure custody with the Public Trustee at Palmerston North by the local member of parliament, who did not tell staff what was in the case. However, as the case was too large to fit in the safe, the treaty documents spent the war at the side of a back corridor in the Public Trust office.

In 1956, the Department of Internal Affairs placed the treaty documents in the care of the Alexander Turnbull Library and they were displayed in 1961. Further preservation steps were taken in 1966, with improvements to the display conditions. From 1977 to 1980, the library extensively restored the documents before the treaty was deposited in the Reserve Bank.

In anticipation of a decision to exhibit the document in 1990 (the sesquicentennial of the signing), full documentation and reproduction photography was carried out. Several years of planning culminated with the opening of the climate-controlled Constitution Room at the National Archives by Mike Moore, Prime Minister of New Zealand, in November 1990. It was announced in 2012 that the nine Treaty of Waitangi sheets would be relocated to the National Library of New Zealand in 2013. In 2017, the He Tohu permanent exhibition at the National Library opened, displaying the treaty documents along with the Declaration of Independence and the 1893 Women's Suffrage Petition.

Treaty text, meaning and interpretation

The treaty, its interpretation and significance can be viewed as the contrast between a literate culture and one that was wholly oral before European contact.

English text

The treaty itself is short, consisting of a preamble and three articles.

The English text (from which the Māori text is translated) starts with the preamble and presents Queen Victoria "being desirous to establish a settled form of Civil Government", and invites Māori chiefs to concur in the following articles. The first article of the English text grants the Queen of England "absolutely and without reservation all the rights and powers of Sovereignty" over New Zealand. The second article guarantees to the chiefs full "exclusive and undisturbed possession of their Lands and Estates Forests Fisheries and other properties". It also specifies that Māori will sell land only to the Crown (Crown pre-emption). The third article guarantees to all Māori the same rights as all other British subjects.

Māori text

The Māori text has the same overall structure, with a preamble and three articles. The first article indicates that the Māori chiefs "give absolutely to the Queen of England for ever the complete government over their land" (according to a modern translation by Hugh Kāwharu). With no adequate word available to substitute for 'sovereignty', as it was not a concept in Māori society at the time, the translators instead used  (governorship or government). The second article also says: "Chiefs will sell land to the Queen at a price agreed to by the person owning it and by the person buying it (the latter being) appointed by the Queen as her purchase agent" (translated), which does not accurately convey the pre-emption clause of the English text. The third article gives Māori the "same rights and duties of citizenship as the people of England" (translated); roughly the same as the English text.

Differences

The English and Māori texts differ. As some words in the English treaty did not translate directly into the written Māori language of the time, the Māori text is not a literal translation of the English text It has been claimed that Henry Williams, the missionary entrusted with translating the treaty from English, was fluent in Māori and that far from being a poor translator he had in fact carefully crafted both versions to make each palatable to both parties without either noticing inherent contradictions.

The differences between the two texts have made it difficult to interpret the treaty and continue to undermine its effect. Few Māori involved with the treaty negotiations understood the concepts of sovereignty or "governorship", as they were used by 19th-century Europeans, and lawyer Moana Jackson has stated that "ceding mana or sovereignty in a treaty was legally and culturally incomprehensible in Māori terms".

Furthermore,  is a loan translation from "governorship" and was not part of the Māori language. The term had been used by Henry Williams in his translation of the Declaration of the Independence of New Zealand which was signed by 35 northern Māori chiefs at Waitangi on 28 October 1835. The Declaration of Independence of New Zealand had stated "" to describe "all sovereign power and authority in the land". There is considerable debate about what would have been a more appropriate term. Some scholars, notably Ruth Ross, argue that  ('prestige', 'authority') would have more accurately conveyed the transfer of sovereignty. However, it has more recently been argued by others, including Judith Binney, that  would not have been appropriate. This is because  is not the same thing as sovereignty, and also because no-one can give up their .

The English-language text recognises Māori rights to "properties", which seems to imply physical and perhaps intellectual property. The Māori text, on the other hand, mentions "taonga", meaning "treasures" or "precious things". In Māori usage the term applies much more broadly than the English concept of legal property, and since the 1980s courts have found that the term can encompass intangible things such as language and culture. Even where physical property such as land is concerned, differing cultural understandings as to what types of land are able to be privately owned have caused problems, as for example in the foreshore and seabed controversy of 2003–04.

The pre-emption clause is generally not well translated. Many Māori apparently believed that they were simply giving the British Queen first offer on land, after which they could sell it to anyone. Another, less important, difference is that , meaning England alone, is used throughout in the Māori text, whereas "the United Kingdom of Great Britain and Ireland" is used in the first paragraph of the English.

Based on these differences, there are many academics who argue that the two versions of the treaty are distinctly different documents they refer to as "Te Tiriti o Waitangi" and "The Treaty of Waitangi", and that the Māori text should take precedence, because it was the one that was signed at Waitangi and by the most signatories. The Waitangi Tribunal, tasked with deciding issues raised by the differences between the two texts, also gives additional weight to the Māori text in its interpretations of the treaty.

The entire issue is further complicated by the fact that, at the time, writing was a novel introduction to Māori society. As members of a predominately oral society, Māori present at the signing of the treaty would have placed more value and reliance on what Hobson and the missionaries said, rather than the written words of the treaty document. Although there is still a great deal of scholarly debate surrounding the extent to which literacy had permeated Māori society at the time of the signing, what can be stated with clarity is that of the 600 plus chiefs who signed the written document only 12 signed their names in the Latin alphabet. Many others conveyed their identity by drawing parts of their  (personal facial tattoo), while still others marked the document with an X.

Māori beliefs and attitudes towards ownership and use of land were different from those prevailing in Britain and Europe. The chiefs would traditionally grant permission for the land to be used for a time for a particular purpose. A northern chief, Nōpera Panakareao, also early on summarised his understanding of the treaty as "" ("The shadow of the land will go to the Queen [of England], but the substance of the land will remain with us"). Nopera later reversed his earlier statement – feeling that the substance of the land had indeed gone to the Queen; only the shadow remained for the Māori.

Role in New Zealand society

Effects on Māori land and rights (1840–1960)

Colony of New Zealand 
In November 1840 a royal charter was signed by Queen Victoria, establishing New Zealand as a Crown colony separate from New South Wales from 3 May 1841. In 1846 the Parliament of the United Kingdom passed the New Zealand Constitution Act 1846 which granted self-government to the colony, requiring Māori to pass an English-language test to be able to participate in the new colonial government. In the same year, Lord Stanley, the British Colonial Secretary, who was a devout Anglican, three times British Prime Minister and oversaw the passage of the Slavery Abolition Act 1833, was asked by Governor George Grey how far he was expected to abide by the treaty. The direct response in the Queen's name was:

At Governor Grey's request, this act was suspended in 1848, as Grey argued it would place the majority Māori under the control of the minority British settlers. Instead, Grey drafted what would later become the New Zealand Constitution Act 1852, which determined the right to vote based on land-ownership franchise. Since most Māori land was communally owned, very few Māori had the right to vote for the institutions of the colonial government. The 1852 Constitution Act also included provision for "Māori districts", where Māori law and custom were to be preserved, but this section was never implemented by the Crown.

Following the election of the first parliament in 1853, responsible government was instituted in 1856. The direction of "native affairs" was kept at the sole discretion of the Governor, meaning control of Māori affairs and land remained outside of the elected ministry. This quickly became a point of contention between the Governor and the colonial parliament, who retained their own "Native Secretary" to advise them on "native affairs". In 1861, Governor Grey agreed to consult the ministers in relation to native affairs, but this position only lasted until his recall from office in 1867. Grey's successor as Governor, George Bowen, took direct control of native affairs until his term ended in 1870. From then on, the elected ministry, led by the Premier, controlled the colonial government's policy on Māori land.

Right of pre-emption 
The short-term effect of the treaty was to prevent the sale of Māori land to anyone other than the Crown. This was intended to protect Māori from the kinds of shady land purchases which had alienated indigenous peoples in other parts of the world from their land with minimal compensation. Before the treaty had been finalised the New Zealand Company had made several hasty land deals and shipped settlers from Great Britain to New Zealand, hoping the British would be forced to accept its land claims as a fait accompli, in which it was largely successful.

In part, the treaty was an attempt to establish a system of property rights for land with the Crown controlling and overseeing land sale to prevent abuse. Initially, this worked well with the Governor and his representatives having the sole right to buy and sell land from the Māori. Māori were eager to sell land, and settlers eager to buy.

The Crown was supposed to mediate the process to ensure that the true owners were properly identified (difficult for tribally owned land) and fairly compensated, by the standards of the time. In particular, the Governor had the responsibility to protect Māori interests. Still, Hobson, as Governor of New Zealand, and his successor Robert FitzRoy both took seriously their duty as protectors of Māori from unscrupulous settlers, working actively to prevent shady land deals. Hobson created a group of "Protectors of the Aborigines"; officials specifically appointed to verify owners, land boundaries, and sales. Lack of funds often prevented land deals at this time, which created discontent among those who were willing but unable to sell. Combined with a growing awareness of the profit margins that the government was receiving by reselling the land at a profit, there was growing discontent among Māori with the pre-emption clause. At this time Māori and others argued that the government's abuse of the pre-emption clause was incompatible with article three of the treaty which guaranteed Māori equal rights to those of British subjects. FitzRoy was sympathetic to their pleas and decided to waive the pre-emption clause in 1844, allowing land sales directly to individuals.

New Zealand Wars and land sales

The growing disagreement over British sovereignty of the country led to several armed conflicts and disputes beginning in the 1840s, including the Flagstaff War, a dispute over the flying of the British Union Flag at the then colonial capital, Kororareka in the Bay of Islands. The Māori King Movement began in the 1850s partly as a means of focusing Māori power in a manner which would allow them to negotiate with the Governor and Queen on equal footing.

Conflict continued to escalate in the early 1860s, when the government used the Māori King Movement as an excuse to invade lands in the eastern parts of the North Island, culminating in the Crown's confiscation of large parts of the Waikato and Taranaki from Māori. The treaty was used to justify the idea that the chiefs of Waikato and Taranaki were rebels against the Crown.

FitzRoy's successor George Grey was appointed Governor in 1845. He viewed the Protectors as an impediment to land acquisition and replaced them with new officials whose goals were not to protect Māori interests, but rather to purchase as much land as possible. Grey restored the Crown's right to pre-emption bypassing the Native Land Purchase Act in 1846, which contemporary writers viewed as a "first step towards a negation of the Treaty of Waitangi". This ordinance also tightened government control of Māori lands, prohibiting Māori from leasing their land and restricting the felling of timber and harvesting of flax. A high court case in 1847 (R v Symonds) upheld the Crown's right to pre-emption and allowed Grey to renegotiate deals made under Fitzroy's waiving of the pre-emption clause. Governor Grey set out to buy large tracts of Māori land in advance of settlement at low prices, later selling it to settlers at higher prices and using the difference to develop land access (roads and bridges). Donald McLean acted as Grey's intermediary and negotiator, and as early as 1840 was aware that Māori had no concept of the sale of land in British sense. Soon Māori became disillusioned and less willing to sell, while the Crown came under increasing pressure from settlers wishing to buy. Consequently, government land agents were involved in a number of dubious land purchases, agreements were sometimes negotiated with only one owner of tribally owned land and in some cases land was purchased from the wrong people altogether. The whole of the South Island was purchased by 1860 in several large deals, and while many of the sales included provisions of 10 per cent of the land set aside for native inhabitants, these land area amounts were not honoured or were later transmuted to much smaller numbers. In some cases Grey or his associates bullied the owners into selling by threatening to drive them out with troops or employ rival chiefs to do so.

In July 1860, during the conflicts, Governor Thomas Gore Browne convened a group of some 200 Māori (including over 100 pro-Crown chiefs handpicked by officials) to discuss the treaty and land for a month at Mission Bay, Kohimarama, Auckland. This became known as the Kohimarama Conference, and was an attempt to prevent the spread of fighting to other regions of New Zealand. But many of the chiefs present were critical of the Crown's handling of the Taranaki conflict. Those at the conference reaffirmed the treaty and the Queen's sovereignty and suggested that a native council be established, but this did not occur.

Native Land Court 
The Native Land Court (later renamed the Māori Land Court) was established under the Native Lands Act 1865, which also finally abolished the Crown right to pre-emption. It was through this court that much Māori land was alienated, and the way in which it functioned is much criticised today. A single member of a tribal group could claim ownership of communal tribal land, which would trigger a court battle in which other tribal members were forced to participate in, or else lose out. The accumulation of court fees, lawyers fees, survey costs, and the cost of travelling to attend court proceedings resulted in mounting debts that could only be paid by the eventual sale of the land. In effect, Māori were safe from the court only until a single tribal member broke ranks and triggered a case, which would invariably result in the sale of the land. By the end of the century, nearly all of the highest quality Māori land had been sold, with only two million hectares remaining in Māori possession.

Although the treaty had never been directly incorporated into New Zealand law, its provisions were first incorporated into specific legislation as early as the Land Claims Ordinance 1841 and the Native Rights Act 1865. However, in the 1877 Wi Parata v Bishop of Wellington judgement, Judge Prendergast argued that the treaty was a "simple nullity" in terms of transferring sovereignty from Māori to the British Crown. This remained the legal orthodoxy until at least the 1970s. Māori have since argued that Prendergast's decision, as well as laws later based on it were a politically convenient and deliberate ploy to legitimise the seizure of Māori land and other resources.

Despite this, Māori frequently used the treaty to argue for a range of demands, including greater independence and return of confiscated and unfairly purchased land. This was especially the case from the mid-19th century, when they lost numerical superiority and generally lost control of most of the country and had little representation in government or the councils where decisions that impacted their affairs were made. Simultaneously, Māori rights over fisheries (guaranteed in article 2 of the treaty) were similarly degraded by laws passed in the late 19th century.

Over the longer term, the land purchase aspect of the treaty declined in importance, while the clauses of the treaty which deal with sovereignty and Māori rights took on greater importance. In 1938, the judgement of the case Te Heuheu Tukino v Aotea District Maori Land Board considered the treaty as valid in terms of the transfer of sovereignty, but the judge ruled that as it was not part of New Zealand law it was not binding on the Crown.

Treaty House and revival 

The treaty returned to the public eye after the Treaty House and grounds were purchased by the Governor-General, Viscount Bledisloe, in the early 1930s and donated to the nation. The dedication of the site as a national reserve in 1934 was probably the first major event held there since the 1840s. The profile of the treaty was further raised by the New Zealand centenary of 1940. For most of the twentieth century, textbooks, government publicity and many historians touted the treaty as the moral foundation of colonisation and argued that it set race relations in New Zealand above those of colonies in North America, Africa and Australia. Popular histories of New Zealand and the treaty often claimed that the treaty was an example of British benevolence and therefore an honourable contract. Even though Māori continued to challenge this narrative, the treaty's lack of legal standing in 1840 and subsequent breaches tended to be overlooked until the 1970s when these issues were raised by the Māori protest movement.

Resurgence and place in New Zealand Law (1960–present)
The Waitangi Day Act 1960 was a token gesture towards acknowledging the Treaty of Waitangi and somewhat preceded the Māori protest movement as a whole. It established Waitangi Day, although it did not make it a public holiday, and the English text of the treaty appeared as a schedule of the Waitangi Day Act but this did not make it a part of statute law. Subsequent amendments to the act, as well as other legislation, eventually acquiesced to campaigns to make Waitangi Day a national holiday in 1976.

During the late 1960s and 1970s, the Treaty of Waitangi became the focus of a strong Māori protest movement which rallied around calls for the government to "honour the treaty" and to "redress treaty grievances". Māori boycotted Waitangi Day in 1968 over the Māori Affairs Amendment Act (which was perceived as a further land grab) and Māori expressed their frustration about continuing violations of the treaty and subsequent legislation by government officials, as well as inequitable legislation and unsympathetic decisions by the Māori Land Court continuing alienation of Māori land from its owners. The protest movement can be seen as part of the worldwide civil rights movements, which emerged in the 1960s.

As a response to the protest movement, the treaty finally received limited recognition in 1975 with the passage of the Treaty of Waitangi Act 1975, which established the Waitangi Tribunal, but this initially had very limited powers to make findings of facts and recommendations only. The act was amended in 1985 to enable it to investigate treaty breaches back to 1840, and also to increase the tribunal membership. The membership was further increased in another amendment in 1988.

Principles of the Treaty of Waitangi

The treaty was incorporated in a limited way into New Zealand law by the State Owned Enterprises Act 1986. Section 9 of the act said "Nothing in this Act shall permit the Crown to act in a manner that is inconsistent with the principles of the Treaty of Waitangi". The government had proposed a transfer of assets from former government departments to state-owned enterprises, but because the state-owned enterprises were essentially private firms owned by the government, there was an argument that they would prevent assets which had been given by Māori for use by the state from being returned to Māori by the Waitangi Tribunal and through treaty settlements. The act was challenged in court in 1987, and the judgement of New Zealand Maori Council v Attorney-General defined the "Principles of the Treaty" and the proposed sale of government assets was found to be in breach of this proviso. This allowed the courts to consider the Crown's actions in terms of compliance with the treaty and established the principle that if the treaty is mentioned in strong terms in a piece of legislation, it takes precedence over other parts of that legislation should they come into conflict. The "Principles of the Treaty" became a common topic in contemporary New Zealand politics, and in 1989, the Fourth Labour Government responded by adopting the "Principles for Crown Action on the Treaty of Waitangi" a similar list of principles to that established in the 1987 court case.

Legislation after the State Owned Enterprises case has followed suit in giving the treaty an increased legal importance. In New Zealand Maori Council v Attorney General (1990) the case concerned FM radio frequencies and found that the treaty could be relevant even concerning legislation which did not mention it and that even if references to the treaty were removed from legislation, the treaty may still be legally relevant. Examples include the ownership of the radio spectrum and the protection of the Māori language.

Bill of Rights 
Some have argued that the treaty should be further incorporated as a part of the New Zealand constitution, to help improve relations between the Crown, Māori and other New Zealanders. The Fourth Labour Government's Bill of Rights White Paper proposed that the treaty be entrenched in the New Zealand Bill of Rights Act 1990. This proposal was never carried through to the legislation, with the attitude of many Māori towards it "suspicious, uneasy, doubtful or undecided". Many Māori were concerned that the proposal would relegate the treaty to a lesser position, and enable the electorate (who under the original Bill of Rights would be able to repeal certain sections by referendum) to remove the treaty from the Bill of Rights altogether. Geoffrey Palmer commented in 2013 that:

During the 1990s there was broad agreement between major political parties that the settlement of historical claims was appropriate. Some disagreed however, and claims of a "Treaty of Waitangi Grievance Industry", which profits from making frivolous claims of violations of the Treaty of Waitangi, were made by a number of political figures in the late 1990s and early 2000s, including former National Party leader Don Brash in his 2004 "Orewa Speech". The "Principles of the Treaty of Waitangi Deletion Bill" was introduced in the New Zealand Parliament in 2005 as a private member's bill by New Zealand First MP Doug Woolerton. Winston Peters, the 13th Deputy Prime Minister of New Zealand, and others supported the bill, which was designed to remove references to the treaty from New Zealand law. The bill failed to pass its second reading in November 2007.

Public opinion 
In terms of public opinion, a study in 2008 found that among the 2,700 voting age New Zealanders surveyed, 37.4% wanted the treaty removed from New Zealand law, 19.7% were neutral, and 36.8% wanted the treaty kept in law; additionally, 39.7% agreed Māori deserved compensation, 15.7% were neutral, and 41.2% disagreed. In 2017, the same study found that among the 3,336 voting age New Zealanders surveyed, 32.99% wanted the treaty removed from New Zealand law, 14.45% were neutral and 42.58% disagreed, and 9.98% didn't know.

Today, the treaty is still not specifically part of New Zealand domestic law, but has been adopted into various acts of parliament ad hoc. It is nevertheless regarded as the founding document of New Zealand.

Waitangi Tribunal claims

During the early 1990s, the government began to negotiate settlements of historical (pre-1992) claims. , there were 23 such settlements of various sizes, totalling approximately $950 million. Settlements generally include financial redress, a formal Crown apology for breaches of the treaty, and recognition of the group's cultural associations with various sites. The tribunal has, in some cases, established that the claimants had not given up sovereignty, and there are ongoing discussions with regards to the applicability of land seized in conflicts and obtained through Crown pre-emption. However, the tribunal's findings do not establish that the Crown does not have sovereignty today, since the Crown has de facto sovereignty in New Zealand regardless and the tribunal has no authority to rule otherwise. Treaty Settlements minister Chris Finlayson emphasised that: "The Tribunal doesn't reach any conclusion regarding the sovereignty the Crown exercises in New Zealand. Nor does it address the other events considered part of the Crown's acquisition of sovereignty or how the Treaty relationship should operate today". Recommendations of the tribunal are not binding on the Crown, but have often been followed.

Commemoration

The anniversary of the signing of the treaty – 6 February – is the New Zealand national day, Waitangi Day. The day was first commemorated in 1934, when the site of the original signing, Treaty House, was made a public reserve (along with its grounds). However, it was not until 1974 that the date was made a public holiday. Waitangi Day has been the focus of protest by Māori (as was particularly the case from the 1970s through to the 1990s), but today the day is often used as an opportunity to discuss the history and lasting effects of the treaty. The anniversary is officially commemorated at the Treaty House at Waitangi, where it was first signed.

Commemorative stamps
In 1940, New Zealand issued a 2d stamp recognising the centenary of the treaty.

New Zealand Post issued a miniature sheet of two stamps in 1990 to commemorate the 150th anniversary of the signing of the treaty.

Another miniature sheet was issued in 2015 to mark the 175th anniversary. The $2.50 sheet showed the figures of Tamati Waka Nene and William Hobson shaking hands.

See also
Constitution of New Zealand
Te Ture Whenua Māori Act 1993 / Māori Land Act 1993
Declaration of the Independence of New Zealand / He Whakaputanga

References

Citations

Bibliography

External links

Information about the treaty at nzhistory.net.nz
Treaty of Waitangi site at archives New Zealand
Comic book explaining the treaty used in New Zealand schools

 
1840 in New Zealand
Constitution of New Zealand
Government of New Zealand
Māori history
Māori politics
Race relations in New Zealand
Memory of the World Register
1840 treaties
Aboriginal title in New Zealand
Treaties of the United Kingdom (1801–1922)
Treaties of New Zealand
Treaties of the Colony of New Zealand
Treaties with indigenous peoples
History of the Bay of Islands
February 1840 events